Impact is a 2009 Canadian action disaster miniseries directed by Mike Rohl, written by Michael Vickerman and distributed by Tandem Communications, starring David James Elliott, Natasha Henstridge, Benjamin Sadler, Steven Culp, James Cromwell and Florentine Lahme as the story shows about a meteor shower which eventually sends the Moon on a collision course with Earth. The two-part (Episodes were called Nights) mini-series premiered February 14 and 15, 2009 on the Canadian premium television channel Super Channel and was also shown on ABC on June 21 and 28, 2009 and on Alpha TV in September 2011. The mini-series was released to DVD by Sony Pictures Home Entertainment.

Plot

During a meteor shower said to be the most spectacular in 10,000 years, an asteroid hidden by the meteor field strikes the Moon. Fragments of the asteroid and of the Moon itself penetrate Earth's atmosphere and make impact. The initial damage is minimal, though significant physical damage to the lunar surface can be seen from Earth. Experts believe that the Moon has stabilized into a slightly closer orbit. Then strange anomalies begin to manifest themselves on Earth, including cell phone disruptions, unusual static discharges and odd tidal behavior. The world's leading scientists, including Alex Kittner, Maddie Rhodes, and Roland Emerson, begin piecing together evidence that suggests the Moon's properties have been permanently altered because the asteroid that hit the Moon was actually a fragment of a brown dwarf; the fragment is highly magnetized and more massive than the Earth despite being only 19 kilometers across, and it is still inside the Moon. When the Moon's new, more elliptical orbit brings it closer to Earth, electromagnetic surges begin affecting the surface, causing people, vehicles, and other objects to levitate at random, worldwide. Alex, Maddie, Roland and the rest of their team soon discover that the Moon's new orbit will cause it to collide with the Earth in 39 days, completely destroying the planet. After a failed attempt by the United States to destroy the Moon with nuclear weapons, the three scientists plan an international mission to the Moon, where astronauts must construct a device to magnetize the Moon's core, causing it to disgorge the embedded brown dwarf fragment, eliminating the magnetic effects and restoring the Moon to a stable orbit. Because of their unique expertise, Alex and Roland must join an American astronaut and a Russian cosmonaut on the mission, which is expected to be a one-way trip.

Roland's pregnant fiancée, Martina Altmann, was travelling across Germany on a train that levitated and derailed. She and an American, Bob Pierce, are able to lead the survivors to a military convoy, and Bob convinces the soldiers to allow Martina to ride to Roland's location. She and Roland are immediately married. Alex's children are left in the care of their late mother's father. When they attempt to drive cross-country to reunite with Alex, their car levitates and crashes. After a confrontation with a man hoarding resources at a convenience store, the children's grandfather suffers a fatal heart attack. The other man originally plans to leave alone, but has a change of heart and brings the children to Washington, DC. Alex is already in space, but he had asked Maddie, with whom he once had a romantic relationship, to make sure his children remained safe. He is able to tell his children "goodbye" over a video feed.

On the Moon, the electromagnetic machine is assembled. Roland and the astronaut, Courtney, travel in a rover to locate a fissure in the lunar surface. The rover crashes deep inside the fissure and Courtney falls to her death. Roland is unharmed but trapped inside the fissure and unable to rejoin the spacecraft. He demands that the cosmonaut, Sergei, launch the module so that he and Alex can be saved. The device is activated, causing a large explosion on the Moon, which kills Roland. The Moon splits in two as the brown dwarf fragment flies into the Sun. The orbit of the lunar debris is stable. Sergei and Alex make radio contact, revealing that they escaped the Moon before the explosion. Back on Earth, Alex is reunited with his children and with Maddie.

Main cast
 David James Elliott as Alex Kittner
 Natasha Henstridge as Maddie Rhodes
 Benjamin Sadler as Roland Emerson
 Steven Culp as President Edward Taylor
 James Cromwell as Alex's father-in-law
 Florentine Lahme as Martina Altmann
 Natasha Calis as Sadie Kittner
 Samantha Ferris as Renee Ferguson
 Ty Olsson as Derek

Filming locations
 Victoria, British Columbia, Canada — Central Park, University of Victoria, Dominion Astrophysical Observatory (CNRC)
 Berlin, Germany

Scientific reaction
The Impact mini-series received little comment from the scientific community due to its lack of realism, incorrect use of terminology, and basic misunderstanding of the law of gravity.

References

External links
 
 Yazel, Leslie, "Early Warning About 'Impact': Urgency Never Hits", June 20, 2009, The Washington Post.

2009 films
2000s Canadian television miniseries
2009 Canadian television series debuts
2009 Canadian television series endings
English-language Canadian films
English-language German films
2000s German television miniseries
2009 German television series debuts
2009 German television series endings
Sat.1 original programming
Television series by Tandem Productions
Television shows filmed in Victoria, British Columbia
Television series about impact events